Anthony Cuff (born 26 December 1957) is a New Zealand former cyclist. He won the Tour of Southland in 1980. He competed in the individual pursuit and team pursuit events at the 1984 Summer Olympics.

References

External links
 

1957 births
Living people
New Zealand male cyclists
Olympic cyclists of New Zealand
Cyclists at the 1984 Summer Olympics
Sportspeople from Palmerston North
Commonwealth Games medallists in cycling
Commonwealth Games silver medallists for New Zealand
Cyclists at the 1978 Commonwealth Games
Medallists at the 1978 Commonwealth Games